Ray Benson (born Ray Benson Seifert, March 16, 1951) is the front man of the Western swing band Asleep at the Wheel as well as an actor and voice actor.

Biography

In 1970, Benson, a native of Philadelphia, formed Asleep at the Wheel with friends Lucky Oceans and Leroy Preston in Paw Paw, West Virginia. They were soon joined by Gene Dobkin, a classmate of Benson's at Antioch College, and Chris O'Connell. The group relocated to Austin in 1973 after a suggestion from Willie Nelson.

Since then, the group has released more than 20 albums and earned 9 Grammy awards. Though the band's lineup has changed greatly over the years (about 90 people have been part of Asleep at the Wheel at some point), Benson has always remained at the helm as the band's driving force.

In addition to his work with Asleep at the Wheel, Benson is also an accomplished producer whose credits include albums by Dale Watson, Suzy Bogguss, Aaron Watson, James Hand and Carolyn Wonderland; also single tracks for Willie Nelson, Aaron Neville, Brad Paisley, Pam Tillis, Trace Adkins, Merle Haggard, and Vince Gill.

In 2003, Benson released his first solo album entitled Beyond Time.

Benson is also a founding member of the Rhythm and Blues Foundation, which raises money to help aging R&B artists, and a member of the board of directors of the SIMS Foundation, which provides low-cost mental health services to Austin musicians and their families.  He is also a trustee for the Texas chapter of NARAS, a board member of St Davids Community Health Foundation, and a board member and founding member of Health Alliance for Austin Musicians (HAAM).

Ray Benson is the former host of the Texas Music Scene TV show. In an interview, Benson said that when he was on the Board of Directors for Austin City Limits, he urged them to start a spin-off show that focused on Texas bands because Austin City Limits had grown beyond its original scope to become an international show. Later he had the opportunity to work with executive producer Tom Hoitsma to host the Texas Music Scene TV, which showcases Texas bands.

Benson announced to his followers on social media that he was diagnosed with the coronavirus in March, 2020. He has since recovered and continues to appear in streaming performances during the worldwide pandemic.

"A Ride With Bob" 

In the Spring of 2005, Ray Benson and Asleep At The Wheel began the production of "A Ride With Bob" that follows the travels of legendary singer/songwriter Bob Wills. A Ride With Bob includes the live performance of 15 of Wills’ best-known songs in a plot that interweaves Ray Benson’s present day with various stages in Wills’ storied career. The play continues to tour throughout the country.

Awards
Benson has been presented numerous awards throughout his career. Most recently, the 16th Annual Midsouth Regional Emmy Award for the making of "A Ride With Bob", an Honorary Junior Member of the United States Secret Service,  and the Darrel K. Royal Music Patron Award by The Texas Heritage Songwriters' Association. In 2007, the Austin Chronicle recognized Benson for Male Vocals, Band of the Year, Songwriter, Record Producer, and for the Country Genre. Benson was inducted into the Austin Music Hall of Fame in 2002, was given The Texas Music Association Lifetime Achievement Award in 1996, and recognized as an Outstanding Producer by the National Academy of Recording Arts in 1988. He has also been given numerous Citations of Achievement by Broadcast Music, Inc. for his work in the country music field. Ray Benson has been one of the strongest names in Country Music for the last forty years. He has earned nine Grammy awards in four different decades.

Willie And The Wheel
In February 2009, Asleep at the Wheel and Willie Nelson released "Willie And The Wheel," a western swing collaboration suggested by veteran producer Jerry Wexler. Nelson has a long-time interest in western swing and had toured with the band in 2007. Paul Shaffer and Vince Gill also perform on this album.

Filmography
 Roadie (1980) ... Ray Benson
 Why Christmas Trees Aren't Perfect (1990) ... Sir Woodrow (voice)
 Never Leave Nevada (1990) ... Composer
 Wild Texas Wind (1991) ... Ray Benson

Discography

Albums

Singles

Music videos

References

External links 

http://www.asleepatthewheel.com
Ray Benson Interview NAMM Oral History Library (2011)

1951 births
Living people
American male voice actors
American country singer-songwriters
Antioch College alumni
Jewish American musicians
American country guitarists
American male guitarists
Asleep at the Wheel members
Grammy Award winners
Singer-songwriters from Pennsylvania
Guitarists from Philadelphia
20th-century American guitarists
Country musicians from Pennsylvania
20th-century American male musicians
Musicians from Austin, Texas
21st-century American Jews
American male singer-songwriters
Singer-songwriters from Texas
Regional Emmy Award winners